Badlapur railway station is a railway station on the Central line of the Mumbai Suburban Railway network. It is built for the town of Badlapur. Loads of daily commuters commute from this station daily.

Trains 

Some of the trains that run from Badlapur are:

 Mumbai CST–Pandharpur Fast Passenger
 Mumbai CST–Bijapur Fast Passenger
 Sainagar Shirdi–Chhatrapati Shivaji Terminus Fast Passenger (via Daund)
 Badlapur–Mumbai CST
 Badlapur–Thane

Gallery

References

Railway stations in Thane district
Mumbai Suburban Railway stations
Mumbai CR railway division
Kalyan-Lonavala rail line